Waima could refer to several places in New Zealand:
Waima, Northland is a community in the Hokianga.
Waima is a suburb of Auckland.
The Waima River in Marlborough flows through the Waima Valley into the Pacific Ocean.